Christian Grasmann (born 16 March 1981) is a German former racing cyclist, who currently works as the team manager of UCI Continental team .

Major results

2009
 2nd Six Days of Zürich (with Leif Lampater)
 3rd Six Days of Munich (with Leif Lampater)
2010
 3rd Six Days of Bremen (with Leif Lampater)
 6th Grand Prix Dobrich I
2015
 2nd Six Days of Copenhagen (with Jesper Mørkøv)
2016
 1st Six Days of Bremen (with Kenny De Ketele)
 2nd Six Days of Rotterdam (with Morgan Kneisky)
2017
 1st Six Days of Rotterdam (with Roger Kluge)

References

External links

1981 births
Living people
German male cyclists
Cyclists from Munich
21st-century German people